Print shop  may refer to:

 Printer (publishing), someone providing commercial printing services
 The Print Shop desktop publishing software